The Bede Professor of Catholic Theology is a professorship or chair in the Department of Theology and Religion at Durham University. The chair is named after the Venerable Bede and is the first such post at a secular British University. The chair was established in 2008, following a benefaction of £2,000,000 from the Diocese of Hexham & Newcastle, Sisters of Mercy, Sisters of La Retraite and the Ballinger Trust.

List of Bede Professors
Lewis Ayres (2009 to 2012)
Karen Kilby (2014 to present)

See also
Durham University
Van Mildert Professor of Divinity
Lightfoot Professor of Divinity

References

Catholic Theology, Bede
Catholic Theology, Bede